Berezina may refer to:

Berezina River
Western Berezina river
Berezina Island, South Shetlands
Russian replenishment ship Berezina
Feminine form of the surname Berezin

See also
Beresina, or the Last Days of Switzerland, a 1999 film
Brezina (disambiguation)
Březina (disambiguation)
Battle of Berezina (disambiguation)